John Hopkins (born in 1949, at Polegate in East Sussex) is a British composer.

Education 
Hopkins studied at University College Cardiff. There his teachers included Alun Hoddinott and Arnold Whittall. He also took composition lessons with Peter Maxwell Davies. He graduated in 2000 from University of Sussex with a D.Phil.

Career 
Hopkins was elected as a regional composer-in-residence by the Eastern Arts Association (now Arts Council England East) in 1979. After several teaching positions, including being co-ordinator of Practice-Based Studies at the Faculty of Music (University of Cambridge), and Director of Studies for Music at Homerton College, Cambridge, he is now Composer in Residence at Homerton College, Cambridge.

Works 
His For the Far Journey (1981) was commissioned and premièred by the Geminii Ensemble and has been described as illustrating characteristics of Hopkin's music, namely 'attractive textures and effective pacing'. White Winter, Black Spring is a composition for two voices and large instrumental ensemble; Hopkins used poems by Robert Lowell for this work commissioned by the BBC.

Some major pieces 
 For the Far Journey (1981)
 The Magic Mountain (1983)
 White Winter, Black Spring (1985)
 Faustus (1986)
 Double Concerto for trumpet and saxophone (1994)
 Akhmatova Songs (2005)
 The Floating World, for mezzo-soprano and orchestra (2008)
 Watching the Perseids (2008)

References

External links 
 UHRecordings, John Hopkins, Composer
 Faculty of Music, University of Cambridge, John Hopkins
 John Hopkins - Homerton College

1949 births
Living people
British composers
People from Polegate
Fellows of Homerton College, Cambridge
Members of the University of Cambridge Faculty of Music